Khuwyptah was a High Priest of Ptah in Memphis from the reign of Neferirkare Kakai in the 5th Dynasty.

Khuwyptah was the son of Kanefer and Tjentety.

A statue group of Kanefer, his wife Tjentety and their son Khuwyptah is in the Kimbell Art Museum. Khuwyptah is shown leaning against his father's right leg.

References

Memphis High Priests of Ptah
Ancient Egyptian priests
People of the Fifth Dynasty of Egypt